Vidyasagar Sonkar is an Indian politician.  He was elected to the Lok Sabha, the lower house of the Parliament of India from Saidpur, Uttar Pradesh as a member of the  Bharatiya Janata Party.

He is currently a member of the Uttar Pradesh Legislative Council and State General Secretary of BJP in Uttar Pradesh. In the elections on 19 April 2018, BJP won 11 out of 13 seats and the remaining two were won by Samajwadi Party and Bahujan Samaj Party each.

References

External links
 Official biographical sketch in Parliament of India website

1961 births
Living people
Bharatiya Janata Party politicians from Uttar Pradesh
Lok Sabha members from Uttar Pradesh
India MPs 1996–1997
Members of the Uttar Pradesh Legislative Council